Events from the year 1524 in Sweden

Incumbents
 Monarch – Gustav I

Events

 - The Protestant reformer Olaus Petri begins his sermons in Stockholm. 
 - The first of the Dalecarlian Rebellions, staged by the deposed bishops Peder Sunnanväder and Knut Mikaelsson and supported by Christina Gyllenstierna and Berent von Mehlen.
 11 September - Treaty of Malmö.

Births

Deaths

 24 March - Ingrid Persdotter, nun famed for her love letters

References

 
Years of the 16th century in Sweden
Sweden